International sanctions have been imposed against Russia and Crimea during the Russo-Ukrainian War by a large number of countries, including the United States, Canada, the European Union, and international organisations following the Russian annexation of Crimea, which began in late February 2014. Belarus has also been sanctioned for its cooperation with and assistance to Russian armed forces. The sanctions were imposed against individuals, businesses, and officials from Russia and Ukraine. Russia responded with sanctions against several countries, including a total ban on food imports from Australia, Canada, Norway, Japan, the United States, and the EU.

The sanctions contributed to the collapse of the Russian ruble and worsened the economic impact of the 2022 Russian invasion of Ukraine. They also caused economic damage to the EU economy, with total losses estimated at €100 billion. , Russia's finance minister announced that the sanctions had cost Russia $40 billion, with another $100 billion loss in 2014 taken due to the decrease in the price of oil the same year. Following the latest sanctions imposed in August 2018, economic losses incurred by Russia amount to some 0.5–1.5% in foregone GDP growth. Russian president Vladimir Putin has accused the United States of conspiring with Saudi Arabia to intentionally weaken the Russian economy by decreasing the price of oil. By mid-2016, Russia had lost an estimated $170 billion due to financial sanctions, with another $400 billion in lost revenues from oil and gas. According to Ukrainian officials, the sanctions forced Russia to change its approach toward Ukraine and undermined the Russian military advances in the region. Representatives of these countries say that they will lift sanctions against Russia only after Moscow fulfills the Minsk II agreements.

, the sanctions by the European Union and United States continue to be in effect. In January 2022, the EU announced the latest extension of sanctions until 31 July 2022. Following Russia's invasion of Ukraine in February 2022, the United States, the EU, and other countries introduced or significantly expanded sanctions to include Vladimir Putin and other government members. They also cut off selected Russian banks from SWIFT. The 2022 boycott of Russia and Belarus triggered the 2022 Russian financial crisis.

Background 

In response to the annexation of Crimea by the Russian Federation and the 2022 Russian invasion of Ukraine, some governments and international organisations, led by the United States and European Union, imposed sanctions on Russian individuals and businesses. As the unrest expanded into other parts of Eastern Ukraine, and later escalated into the ongoing war in the Donbass region, the scope of the sanctions increased. Overall, three types of sanctions were imposed: ban on provision of technology for oil and gas exploration, ban on provision of credits to Russian oil companies and state banks, travel restrictions on the influential Russian citizens close to President Putin and involved in the annexation of Crimea. The Russian government responded in kind, with sanctions against some Canadian and American individuals and, in August 2014, with a total ban on food imports from the European Union, United States, Norway, Canada and Australia.

Sanctions against Russian and Ukrainian individuals, companies and officials

First round: March/April 2014 
On 6 March 2014, U.S. president Barack Obama, invoking, inter alia, the International Emergency Economic Powers Act and the National Emergencies Act, signed an executive order declaring a national emergency and ordering sanctions, including travel bans and the freezing of U.S. assets, against not-yet-specified individuals who had "asserted governmental authority in the Crimean region without the authorization of the Government of Ukraine" and whose actions were found, inter alia, to "undermine democratic processes and institutions in Ukraine".

On 17 March 2014, the United States, the European Union, and Canada introduced specifically targeted sanctions, the day after the disputed Crimean referendum and a few hours before Russian president Vladimir Putin signed a decree recognizing Crimea as an independent state, laying the groundwork for its annexation of Crimea by Russia. The principal EU sanction aimed to "prevent the entry into ... their territories of the natural persons responsible for actions which undermine ... the territorial integrity ... of Ukraine, and of natural persons associated with them, as listed in the Annex". The EU imposed its sanctions "in the absence of de-escalatory steps by the Russian Federation" in order to bring an end to the violence in eastern Ukraine. The EU at the same time clarified that the union "remains ready to reverse its decisions and reengage with Russia when it starts contributing actively and without ambiguities to finding a solution to the Ukrainian crisis".

These 17 March sanctions were the most wide-ranging sanctions used against Russia since the 1991 fall of the Soviet Union. Japan also announced sanctions against Russia, which included the suspension of talks regarding military matters, space, investment, and visa requirements. A few days later, the US government expanded the sanctions.

On 19 March, Australia imposed sanctions against Russia after its annexation of Crimea. These sanctions targeted financial dealings and travel bans on those who have been instrumental in the Russian threat to Ukraine's sovereignty. Australian sanctions were expanded on 21 May.

In early April, Albania, Iceland and Montenegro, as well as Ukraine, imposed the same restrictions and travel bans as those of the EU on 17 March. Igor Lukšić, foreign minister of Montenegro, said that despite a "centuries old-tradition" of good ties with Russia, joining the EU in imposing sanctions had "always been the only reasonable choice". Slightly earlier in March, Moldova imposed the same sanctions against former president of Ukraine Viktor Yanukovych and a number of former Ukrainian officials, as announced by the EU on 5 March.

In response to the sanctions introduced by the United States and the European Union, the State Duma (Lower House of the Russian parliament) unanimously passed a resolution asking for all members of the Duma be included on the sanctions list. The sanctions were expanded to include prominent Russian businessmen and women a few days later.

Second round: April 2014 
On 10 April, the Council of Europe suspended the voting rights of Russia's delegation.

On 28 April, the United States imposed a ban on business transactions within its territory on seven Russian officials, including Igor Sechin, executive chairman of the Russian state oil company Rosneft, and 17 Russian companies.

On the same day, the EU issued travel bans against a further 15 individuals. The EU also stated the aims of EU sanctions as:

sanctions are not punitive, but designed to bring about a change in policy or activity by the target country, entities or individuals. Measures are therefore always targeted at such policies or activities, the means to conduct them and those responsible for them. At the same time, the EU makes every effort to minimise adverse consequences for the civilian population or for legitimate activities.

Third round: 2014–2021

2014 
In response to the escalating War in Donbass, on 17 July 2014 the United States extended its transactions ban to two major Russian energy firms, Rosneft and Novatek, and to two banks, Gazprombank and Vnesheconombank. United States also urged EU leaders to join the third wave leading EU to start drafting European sanctions a day before. On 25 July, the EU officially expanded its sanctions to an additional 15 individuals and 18 entities, followed by an additional eight individuals and three entities on 30 July. On 31 July 2014 the EU introduced the third round of sanctions which included an embargo on arms and related material, and embargo on dual-use goods and technology intended for military use or a military end user, a ban on imports of arms and related material, controls on export of equipment for the oil industry, and a restriction on the issuance of and trade in certain bonds, equity or similar financial instruments on a maturity greater than 90 days (In September 2014 lowered to 30 days)

On 24 July 2014, Canada targeted Russian arms, energy and financial entities. On 5 August 2014, Japan froze the assets of "individuals and groups supporting the separation of Crimea from Ukraine" and restrict imports from Crimea. Japan also froze funds for new projects in Russia in line with the policy of the multilateral European Bank for Reconstruction and Development. On 8 August 2014, Australian prime minister Tony Abbott announced that Australia is "working towards" tougher sanctions against Russia, which should be implemented in the coming weeks.

On 12 August 2014, Norway adopted the tougher sanctions against Russia that were imposed by the European Union and the United States on 12 August 2014. The Norwegian foreign minister Børge Brende said that it would impose restrictions similar to the EU's 1 August sanctions. Russian state-owned banks will be banned from taking long-term and mid-term loans, arms exports will be banned and supplies of equipment, technology and assistance to the Russian oil sector will be prohibited.

On 14 August 2014, Switzerland expanded sanctions against Russia over its threat to Ukraine's sovereignty. Swiss government added 26 more Russians and pro-Russian Ukrainians to the list of sanctioned Russian citizens that was first announced after Russia's annexation of Crimea. On 27 August 2014 Switzerland further expanded their sanctions against Russia. The Swiss government said it is expanding measures to prevent the circumvention of sanctions relating to the situation in Ukraine to include the third round of sanctions imposed by the EU in July. The Swiss government also stated that five Russian banks (Sberbank, VTB, Vnesheconombank (VEB), Gazprombank and Rosselkhoz) will require authorisation to issue long-term financial instruments in Switzerland. On 28 August 2014, Switzerland amended its sanctions to include the sanctions imposed by the EU in July.

On 14 August 2014, Ukraine passed a law introducing Ukrainian sanctions against Russia. The law includes 172 individuals and 65 entities in Russia and other countries for supporting and financing "terrorism" in Ukraine, though actual sanctions would need approval from Ukraine's National Security and Defense Council.

On 11 September 2014, US president Obama said that the United States would join the EU in imposing tougher sanctions on Russia's financial, energy and defence sectors. On 12 September 2014, the United States imposed sanctions on Russia's largest bank (Sberbank), a major arms maker and arctic (Rostec), deepwater and shale exploration by its biggest oil companies (Gazprom, Gazprom Neft, Lukoil, Surgutneftegas and Rosneft). Sberbank and Rostec will have limited ability to access the US debt markets. The sanction on the oil companies seek to ban co-operation with Russian oil firms on energy technology and services by companies including Exxon Mobil Corp. and BP Plc.

On 24 September 2014, Japan banned the issue of securities by 5 Russian banks (Sberbank, VTB, Gazprombank, Rosselkhozbank and development bank VEB) and also tightened restrictions on defence exports to Russia.

On 3 October 2014, US vice president Joe Biden said that "It was America's leadership and the president of the United States insisting, ofttimes almost having to embarrass Europe to stand up and take economic hits to impose costs" and added that "And the results have been massive capital flight from Russia, a virtual freeze on foreign direct investment, a ruble at an all-time low against the dollar, and the Russian economy teetering on the brink of recession. We don't want Russia to collapse. We want Russia to succeed. But Putin has to make a choice. These asymmetrical advances on another country cannot be tolerated. The international system will collapse if they are."

On 18 December 2014, the EU banned some investments in Crimea, halting support for Russian Black Sea oil and gas exploration and stopping European companies from purchasing real estate or companies in Crimea, or offering tourism services. On 19 December 2014, US president Obama imposed sanctions on Russian-occupied Crimea by executive order prohibiting exports of US goods and services to the region.

2015 
On 16 February 2015, the EU increased its sanction list to cover 151 individuals and 37 entities. Australia indicated that it would follow the EU in a new round of sanctions. If the EU sanctioned new Russian and Ukrainian entities then Australia would keep their sanctions in line with the EU.

On 18 February 2015, Canada added 37 Russian citizens and 17 Russian entities to its sanction list. Rosneft and the deputy minister of defence, Anatoly Antonov, were both sanctioned. In June 2015 Canada added three individuals and 14 entities, including Gazprom. Media suggested the sanctions were delayed because Gazprom was a main sponsor of the 2015 FIFA Women's World Cup then concluding in Canada.

In September 2015, Ukraine sanctioned more than 388 individuals, over 105 companies and other entities. In accordance with the August 2015 proposals promulgated by the Security Service of Ukraine and the Order of the Cabinet of Ministers of Ukraine No. 808-p dated 12 August 2015, Ukraine, on 2 September 2015, declared Russia an enemy of Ukraine. Also on 16 September 2015, the Ukrainian president Petro Poroshenko issued a decree that named nearly 400 individuals, more than 90 companies and other entities to be sanctioned for the Russia's "criminal activities and aggression against Ukraine."

Fourth round: 2022 

After Russia invaded Ukraine on 24 February 2022, two countries that had not previously taken part in sanctions, namely South Korea and non-UN member state Taiwan, engaged in sanctions against Russia. On 28 February 2022, Singapore announced that it will impose banking sanctions against Russia for the invasion of Ukraine, thus making it the first country in Southeast Asia to impose sanctions upon Russia; the move was described by the South China Morning Post as being "almost unprecedented". The sanctions also included materials that could be used for weapons against Ukraine, as well as electronics, technology devices and other related equipment, which were listed in a detailed statement on 5 March.

On 28 February 2022, the Central Bank of Russia was blocked from accessing more than $400 billion in foreign-exchange reserves held abroad and the EU imposed sanctions on several Russian oligarchs and politicians.

Sergei Aleksashenko, the former Russian deputy finance minister, said: "This is a kind of financial nuclear bomb that is falling on Russia." On 1 March 2022, the French finance minister Bruno Le Maire said the total amount of Russian assets being frozen by sanctions amounted to $1 trillion.

Serbia, Mexico and Brazil have announced that they would not be participating in any economic sanctions against Russia.

Western countries and others began imposing limited sanctions on Russia when it recognised the independence of Donbas. With the commencement of attacks on 24 February, a large number of other countries began applying sanctions with the aim of crippling the Russian economy. The sanctions were wide-ranging, targeting individuals, banks, businesses, monetary exchanges, bank transfers, exports, and imports.

Faisal Islam of BBC News stated that the measures were far from normal sanctions and were "better seen as a form of economic war". The intent of the sanctions was to push Russia into a deep recession with the likelihood of bank runs and hyperinflation. Islam noted that targeting a G20 central bank in this way had never been done before. Deputy Chairman of the Security Council of Russia and former president Dmitry Medvedev derided Western sanctions imposed on Russia, including personal sanctions, and commented that they were a sign of "political impotence" resulting from NATO's withdrawal from Afghanistan. He threatened to nationalise foreign assets that companies held inside Russia.

On 14 March 2022, Biden's national security advisor Jake Sullivan warned China that it would face consequences if it helped Russia evade sanctions.

Oil 

Senator Roger Marshall introduced a bill on 1 March 2022 banning US imports of Russian oil, supported by the GOP minority leader of the Senate Committee on Energy and Natural Resources and seven other Republicans. The first move by a Western nation to impose a flat blockade on Russian petroleum, its top moneymaker, came a day prior from Canada. President Justin Trudeau said that it "sends a powerful message."

On 8 March, President Joe Biden ordered a ban on imports of oil, gas and coal from Russia to the US.

The EU will ban all imports of refined oil products from Russia in February 2023, the UK will ban Russian oil imports from December 2022. EU imports of oil by ship have fallen by 1.2m bpd to under 0.1m bpd.

On September 2, 2022, the G7 group of nations agreed to cap the price of Russian oil in order to reduce Russia's ability to finance its war with Ukraine without further increasing inflation. Joined by the European Union and Australia, the sanctions come into effect on 5 December 2022. From 5 February 2023 an oil products price cap came into effect.

Banking 
In a 22 February speech, US president Joe Biden announced restrictions against four Russian banks, including V.E.B., as well as on corrupt billionaires close to Putin. UK prime minister Boris Johnson announced that all major Russian banks would have their assets frozen and be excluded from the UK financial system, and that some export licences to Russia would be suspended. He also introduced a deposit limit for Russian citizens in UK bank accounts, and froze the assets of over 100 additional individuals and entities.

The foreign ministers of the Baltic states called for Russia to be cut off from SWIFT, the global messaging network for international payments. Other EU member states had initially been reluctant to do this, both because European lenders held most of the nearly $30 billion in foreign banks' exposure to Russia and because China had developed an alternative to SWIFT called CIPS; a weaponisation of SWIFT would provide greater impetus to the development of CIPS which, in turn, could weaken SWIFT as well as the West's control over international finance. Other leaders calling for Russia to be stopped from accessing SWIFT include Czech president Miloš Zeman, and UK prime minister Boris Johnson.

Germany had resisted calls for Russia to be banned from SWIFT, citing the effect it would have on payments for Russian gas and oil; on 26 February, the German foreign minister Annalena Baerbock and economy minister Robert Habeck made a joint statement backing targeted restrictions of Russia from SWIFT. Shortly thereafter, it was announced that major Russian banks would be removed from SWIFT, although there would still be limited accessibility to ensure the continued ability to pay for gas shipments. Furthermore, it was announced that the West would place sanctions on the Russian Central Bank, which holds $630bn in foreign reserves, to prevent it from liquidating assets to offset the impact of sanctions.

On 26 February, two Chinese state banks—the Industrial and Commercial Bank of China, which is the largest bank in the world, and the Bank of China, which is the country's biggest currency trader—were limiting financing to purchase Russian raw materials, which was limiting Russian access to foreign currency. On 28 February, Switzerland froze a number of Russian assets and joined EU sanctions. According to Ignazio Cassis, the president of the Swiss Confederation, the decision was unprecedented but consistent with Swiss neutrality. The same day, Monaco adopted economic sanctions and procedures for freezing funds identical to those taken by most European states. Singapore became the first Southeast Asian country to impose sanctions on Russia by restricting banks and transactions linked to Russia; the move was described by the South China Morning Post as being "almost unprecedented". South Korea announced it would participate in the SWIFT ban against Russia, as well as announcing an export ban on strategic materials covered by the "Big 4" treaties to which Korea belongs—the Nuclear Suppliers Group, the Wassenaar Arrangement, the Australia Group, and the Missile Technology Control Regime; in addition, 57 non-strategic materials, including semiconductors, IT equipment, sensors, lasers, maritime equipment, and aerospace equipment, were planned to be included in the export ban "soon".

On 28 February, Japan announced that its central bank would join sanctions by limiting transactions with Russia's central bank, and would impose sanctions on Belarusian organisations and individuals, including President Aleksandr Lukashenko, because of Belarus' "evident involvement in the invasion" of Ukraine. According to The Wall Street Journal, payments for energy raw materials have been largely spared from these measures. The Central Bank of Russia was blocked from accessing more than $400 billion in foreign-exchange reserves held abroad. Sergei Aleksashenko, the former Russian deputy finance minister, said: "This is a kind of financial nuclear bomb that is falling on Russia." EU foreign affairs chief Josep Borrell said that Western governments "cannot block the reserves of the Russian central bank in Moscow or in China".

On 1 March, the Grand and General Council of San Marino authorised the country's government to take sanctions against Russia, and rejected that the measures had a military content. The same day, the French finance minister Bruno Le Maire said that Russian assets being frozen by sanctions amounted to $1 trillion. South Korea announced it would stop all transactions with 7 main Russian banks and their affiliates, restrict the purchase of Russian treasury bonds, and agreed to "immediately implement" and join any further economics sanctions imposed against Russia by the European Union.

Following sanctions and criticisms of their relations with Russian business, many companies chose to exit Russian or Belarusian markets voluntarily or in order to avoid potential future sanctions. Visa, Mastercard, and American Express independently blocked Russian banks as of 2 March. Following Swiss sanctions on Russia, Credit Suisse issued orders to destroy documents linking Russian oligarchs to yacht loans, a move which led to considerable criticism.

Export 
The US instituted export controls, a novel sanction focused on restricting Russian access to high-tech components, both hardware and software, made with any parts or intellectual property from the US. The sanction required that any person or company that wanted to sell technology, semiconductors, encryption software, lasers, or sensors to Russia request a licence, which by default was denied. The enforcement mechanism involved sanctions against the person or company, with the sanctions focused on the shipbuilding, aerospace, and defence industries.

EU sanctions 
On the morning of 24 February, Ursula von der Leyen, the president of the European Commission, announced "massive" EU sanctions to be adopted by the union. The sanctions targeted technological transfers, Russian banks, and Russian assets. Josep Borrell, the High Representative of the Union for Foreign Affairs and Security Policy, stated that Russia would face "unprecedented isolation" as the EU would impose the "harshest package of sanctions [which the union has] ever implemented". He also said that "these are among the darkest hours of Europe since the Second World War". President of the European Parliament Roberta Metsola called for "immediate, quick, solid and swift action" and convened an extraordinary session of Parliament for 1 March.

In May 2022, the European Commission proposed and approved a partial ban on oil imports from Russia, part of the economic response to the Russian invasion of Ukraine.

European sanctions are imposed according to Decision 2014/145/CFSP of the European Council and EU Regulation 269/2014, which authorize the freezing of assets.

Josep Borrell said he wants EU countries to confiscate frozen foreign-exchange reserves of the Russian central bank —which amount to over $300 billion— to cover the costs of rebuilding Ukraine after the war. Russian Deputy Foreign Minister Alexander Grushko remarked that Borrell's initiative amounted to "complete lawlessness" and said it would hurt Europe if adopted.

European impoundment of ships 
A 5 April 2022 article by Insider claims the total cost of yachts impounded throughout Europe be over $2 billion. This amount includes the motoryacht Tango, seized pursuant to United States sanctions with Spanish assistance.

France 
On 26 February, the French Navy intercepted Russian cargo ship Baltic Leader in the English Channel. The ship was suspected of belonging to a company targeted by the sanctions. The ship was escorted to the port of Boulogne-sur-Mer and was being investigated.

On 2 March 2022, French customs officials seized the yacht Amore Vero at a shipyard in La Ciotat. The Amore Vero is believed to be owned by the sanctioned oligarch Igor Sechin.

Two yachts belonging to Alexei Kuzmichevof Alfa Bank were seized by France on March 24.

Germany 

On 2 March 2022, German authorities immobilized Dilbar, owned by Alisher Usmanov. She is reported to have cost $800 million, employ 84 full-time crew members, and contain the largest indoor swimming pool installed on a superyacht at 180 cubic metres.

Italy 
On 4 March, Italian police impounded Lady M. Authorities believe the ship is owned by Alexei Mordashov. The same day, Italian police seized the yacht of Gennady Timchenko, Lena, in the port city of Sanremo. The yacht was also placed on a United States sanctions list. On 12 March 2022, Italian authorities in the port of Trieste seized the sailing yacht A, known to be owned by Andrey Melnichenko. A spokesperson for Melnichenko vowed to contest the seizure.

Spain 
In March 2022, the Spanish Ministry of Development (known by its acronym "MITMA") detained three yachts pending investigation into whether their true owners are individuals sanctioned by the European Union. Valerie is detained in the Port of Barcelona; Lady Anastasia in Port Adriano in Calvià, Mallorca; and Crescent in the Port of Tarragona.

United Kingdom 
On 29 March 2022, Grant Shapps, the British secretary of state for transport, announced the National Crime Agency's seizure of Phi. The yacht was docked at Canary Wharf and was about to leave.

Netherlands 
On 6 April 2022, Dutch Minister of Foreign Affairs Wopke Hoekstra sent a letter on the subject of sanctions addressed to the House of Representatives. In it, he reported that while no Russian superyachts were at anchor in the Netherlands, twelve yachts under construction across five shipyards were immobilized to ascertain ownership, including possible beneficial ownership.

Greece 
On 19 April 2022, Greece announced the seizure of the Russian-flagged petroleum tanker ship Pegas, which docked at Karystos after encountering rough seas. The seizure applies solely to the ship and not its cargo.

Sanctions against Crimea 
The United States, Canada, the European Union, and other European countries (including Ukraine) imposed economic sanctions specifically targeting Crimea. Sanctions prohibit the sale, supply, transfer, or export of goods and technology in several sectors, including services directly related to tourism and infrastructure. They list seven ports where cruise ships cannot dock. Sanctions against Crimean individuals include travel bans and asset freezes. Visa and MasterCard have stopped service in Crimea between December 2014 and April 2015.

In September 2016 Pursuant to Executive Order 13685, OFAC designated Russian shipping company Sovfracht-Sovmortrans Group and its subsidiary, Sovfracht for operating in Crimea.

Sanctions over Ukrainians held by Russia 
In April 2016, Lithuania sanctioned 46 individuals who were involved in the detention and sentencing of Ukrainian citizens Nadiya Savchenko, Oleh Sentsov, and Olexandr Kolchenko. Lithuanian foreign minister Linas Linkevičius said that his country wanted to "focus attention on the unacceptable and cynical violations of international law and human rights in Russia. [...] It would be more effective if the blacklist became Europe-wide. We hope to start such a discussion."

Opposition to sanctions 

Italy, Hungary, Greece, France, Cyprus and Slovakia are among the EU states most skeptical about the sanctions and have called for review of sanctions. The Hungarian prime minister Viktor Orbán stated that Europe "shot itself in the foot" by introducing economic sanctions. Bulgarian prime minister Boyko Borisov stated, "I don't know how Russia is affected by the sanctions, but Bulgaria is affected severely"; Czech president Miloš Zeman and Slovak prime minister Robert Fico also said that the sanctions should be lifted. In October 2017, the Hungarian minister of foreign affairs and trade Péter Szijjártó added that the sanctions "were totally unsuccessful because Russia is not on its knees economically, but also because there have been many harms to our own economies and, politically speaking, we have had no real forward progress regarding the Minsk agreement".

In 2015, the Greek prime minister Alexis Tsipras repeatedly said that Greece would seek to mend ties between Russia and EU through European institutions. Tsipras also said that Greece was not in favour of Western sanctions imposed on Russia, adding that it risked the start of another Cold War.

A number of business figures in France and Germany have opposed the sanctions. The German economy minister Sigmar Gabriel said that the Ukrainian crisis should be resolved by dialogue rather than economic confrontation, later adding that the reinforcement of anti-Russian sanctions will "provoke an even more dangerous situation... in Europe".

Paolo Gentiloni, the Italian minister of foreign affairs, said that the sanctions "are not the solution to the conflict". In January 2017, Swiss economics minister and former president of Switzerland Johann Schneider-Ammann stated his concern about the sanctions' harm to the Swiss economy, and expressed hope that they will soon come to an end. Some companies, most notably Siemens Gas Turbine Technologies LLC and Lufthansa Service Holding were reported to attempt bypassing the sanctions and exporting power generation turbines to the annexed Crimea.

In August 2015, the British think tank Bow Group released a report on sanctions, calling for the removal of them. According to the report, the sanctions have had "adverse consequences for European and American businesses, and if they are prolonged... they can have even more deleterious effects in the future"; the potential cost of sanctions for the Western countries has been estimated as over $700 billion.

In June 2017, Germany and Austria criticized the U.S. Senate over new sanctions against Russia that target the planned Nord Stream 2 gas pipeline from Russia to Germany, stating that the United States was threatening Europe's energy supplies (see also Russia in the European energy sector). In a joint statement Austria's chancellor Christian Kern and Germany's foreign minister Sigmar Gabriel said that "Europe's energy supply is a matter for Europe, and not for the United States of America." They also said: "To threaten companies from Germany, Austria and other European states with penalties on the U.S. market if they participate in natural gas projects such as Nord Stream 2 with Russia or finance them introduces a completely new and very negative quality into European-American relations."

In May 2018, the vice chairman of Free Democratic Party of Germany and the vice president of the Bundestag Wolfgang Kubicki said that Germany should "take a first step towards Russia with the easing of the economic sanctions" because "this can be decided by Germany alone" and "does not need the consent of others".

In February 2019, advisor to Municipal Councilor of Municipality of Verona, member of House of Representatives Vito Comencini said that the anti-Russian sanctions have caused significant damage to the Italian economy, with the result that the country suffers losses every day in the amount of millions of euros.

Nations and individuals that oppose sanctions against Russia state that sanctions do not generally result in a change in the policies of the sanctioned nation and that sanctions mostly hurt the civilian population who have little control over the issues pertaining to foreign policy.

In March 2022, China expressed opposition to sanctions against Russia as punishment for invading Ukraine. No country in Africa, Latin America or the Middle East has imposed sanctions on Russia.

In March 2022, former Swiss councilor Christoph Blocher announced the ballot initiative 'Pro Souveräne Schweiz' (PSS), which would amend "integral neutrality" to the Swiss constitution. If approved, economic sanctions for example against Russia in 2022, would constitute a violation of Swiss neutrality. The initiative launched in September 2022 was supported by the right-leaning Swiss People's Party (SVP), when the Parliament of Switzerland voted against a revision of its law to impose independent sanctions.

As part of the sanctions imposed on Russia, on 2 September 2022, the finance ministers of the G7 group agreed to cap the price of Russian oil and petroleum products, designed to allow Russia to maintain production but limiting the revenue from oil sales. In October 2022, India (the world’s third-largest oil importer) announced it would not join the effort to cap the price of Russian oil. India obtains Russian crude at a significant discount, and regards Russia as a strategic, economic partner.

Efforts to lift sanctions 
France announced in January 2016 that it wanted to lift the sanctions in mid-2016. Earlier, U.S. Secretary of State John Kerry mentioned a possible lifting of sanctions.

In June 2016, the French Senate voted to urge its government to "gradually and partially" lift the EU sanctions on Russia, although the vote was non-binding.

However, in September 2016, the EU extended its sanctions, for another six months, against Russian officials and pro-Moscow separatists in Ukraine. An EU asset freeze on ex-Ukrainian president Viktor Yanukovych was upheld by the bloc's courts. On 13 March 2017, the EU extended the asset freeze and travel bans on 150 people until September 2017. The sanctions include Yanukovych and senior members of his administration.

As Trump's National Security Advisor, Michael T. Flynn was an important link in the connections between Putin and Trump in the "Ukraine peace plan", an unofficial plan "organized outside regular diplomatic channels....at the behest of top aides to President Putin". This plan, aimed at easing the sanctions imposed on Russia, progressed from Putin and his advisors to Ukrainian politician Andrey Artemenko, Felix Sater, Michael Cohen, and Flynn, where he would have then presented it to Trump. The New York Times reported that Sater delivered the plan "in a sealed envelope" to Cohen, who then passed it on to Flynn in February 2017, just before his resignation.

On 19 June 2017, the EU again extended sanctions for another year that prohibit EU businesses from investing in Crimea, and which target tourism and imports of products from Crimea.

In November 2017, the Secretary General of the Council of Europe Thorbjørn Jagland said that the Council of Europe considered lifting the sanctions on Russia due to concerns that Russia may leave the organization, which would be "a big step back for Europe". Jagland was also criticized of "caving in to blackmail" by other Council members for his conciliatory approach to Russia.

On 9 October 2018, the council's parliamentary assembly voted to postpone the decision on whether Russia's voting rights should be restored.

On 8 March 2019, the Italian prime minister Giuseppe Conte stated that Italy is working on lifting the sanctions, which "the ruling parties in Rome say are ineffective and hurt the Italian economy".

Other sanctions on Russia

United States 
In December 2012, the US enacted the Magnitsky Act, intended to punish Russian officials responsible for the death of Russian tax accountant Sergei Magnitsky in a Moscow prison in 2009 by prohibiting their entry to the US and use of its banking system. 18 individuals were originally affected by the Act. In December 2016, Congress enacted the Global Magnitsky Act to allow the US Government to sanction foreign government officials implicated in human rights abuses anywhere in the world. On 21 December 2017, 13 additional names were added to the list of sanctioned individuals, not just Russians. Other countries passed similar laws to ban foreigners deemed guilty of human rights abuses from entering their countries.

On 29 December 2016, the US president Barack Obama signed an Executive Order that expelled 35 Russian diplomats, locked down two Russian diplomatic compounds, and expanded sanctions against Russia for its interference in the 2016 United States elections.

In August 2017, the US Congress enacted the Countering America's Adversaries Through Sanctions Act that imposed new sanctions on Russia for interference in the 2016 elections and its involvement in Ukraine and Syria. The act converted the punitive measures previously imposed by executive orders into law to prevent the president easing, suspending or ending of sanctions without the approval of Congress.

On 15 March 2018, Trump imposed financial sanctions under the act on the 13 Russian government hackers and front organizations that had been indicted by Mueller's investigation into Russian interference in the 2016 United States elections. On 6 April 2018, the United States imposed economic sanctions on seven Russian oligarchs and 12 companies they control, accusing them of "malign activity around the globe", along with 17 top Russian officials, the state-owned weapons-trading company Rosoboronexport and Russian Financial Corporation Bank (RFC Bank). High-profile names on the list include Oleg Deripaska and Kiril Shamalov, Putin's ex-son-in-law, who married Putin's daughter Katerina Tikhonova in February 2013. The press release stated: "Deripaska has been investigated for money laundering, and has been accused of threatening the lives of business rivals, illegally wiretapping a government official, and taking part in extortion and racketeering. There are also allegations that Deripaska bribed a government official, ordered the murder of a businessman, and had links to a Russian organized crime group." Other names on the list include: Oil tycoon Vladimir Bogdanov, Suleyman Kerimov, who faces money-laundering charges in France for allegedly bringing hundreds of millions of euros into the country without reporting the money to tax authorities, Igor Rotenberg, principal owner of Russian oil and gas drilling company Gazprom Burenie, Andrei Skoch, a deputy in the State Duma. U.S. officials said he has longstanding ties to Russian organized criminal groups, Viktor Vekselberg, founder and chairman of the Renova Group, asset management company, and Aleksandr Torshin.

In August 2018, following the poisoning of Sergey Skripal, the U.S. Department of Commerce imposed further sanctions on dual-use exports to Russia which were deemed to be sensitive on national security grounds, including gas turbine engines, integrated circuits, and calibration equipment used in avionics. Until that moment, such exports were considered on a case-by-case basis. Following the introduction of these sanctions, the default position is of denial. Also, on September that year a list of companies in the space and defense industry came under sanctions, including: AeroComposit, Divetechnoservices, Scientific-Research Institute "Vektor", Nilco Group, Obinsk Research and Production Enterprise, Aviadvigatel, Information Technology and Communication Systems (Infoteks), Scientific and Production Corporation of Precision Instruments Engineering and Voronezh Scientific Research Institute "Vega", whom are forbidden from doing business with.

In March 2019, the United States imposed sanctions on persons and companies involved in the Russian shipbuilding industry in response to the Kerch Strait incident: Yaroslavsky Shipbuilding Plant, Zelenodolsk Shipyard Plant, AO Kontsern Okeanpribor, PAO Zvezda (Zvezda), AO Zavod Fiolent (Fiolent), GUP RK KTB Sudokompozit (Sudokompozit), LLC SK Consol-Stroi LTD and LLC Novye Proekty. Also, the U.S. targeted persons involved in the 2018 Donbass general elections.

On 2 August 2019, the U.S State Department announced additional sanctions together with an executive order signed by President Trump which gives the Department of Treasury and the Department of Commerce the authority to implement the sanctions. The sanctions forbid granting Russia loans or other assistance from international financial institutions, prohibition on U.S banks buy non-ruble denominated bonds issued by the Russia after 26 August and lending non-ruble denominated funds to Russia and licensing restrictions for exports of items for chemical and biological weapons proliferation reasons. In September 2019, pursuant to Executive Order 13685 Maritime Assistance LLC was placed under sanctions due to its export of fuel to Syria as well as for providing support to Sovfracht, another company sanctioned for operating in Crimea. Later in the same month, the United States sanctioned two Russian citizens as well as three companies, Autolex Transport, Beratex Group and Linburg Industries in connection with the Russian interference in the 2016 United States election.

In February 2022, President Joe Biden signed Executive Order 14065 of February 21, 2022 — "Blocking Property of Certain Persons and Prohibiting Certain Transactions With Respect to Continued Russian Efforts To Undermine the Sovereignty and Territorial Integrity of Ukraine"

A year after Russia’s invasion of Ukraine, the United States persuaded countries like Turkey and the United Arab Emirates to crack down on the commercial activities in their countries which had been helping Russia’s war efforts in Ukraine. These countries did not back the western sanctions imposed on Russia, instead continuing to trade with it and providing havens for wealthy Russians and their capital.
The United States marked the first anniversary of Russia's invasion of Ukraine on February 24, 2023, with new sanctions against Russia aimed at undermining Moscow's ability to launch a war. The new measures by the US Treasury Department affect 22 Russian individuals and 83 entities, adding to the more than 2,500 sanctions imposed last year.

International organizations 
In January 2018, the EU sanctioned entities who participated in the construction of the Crimea Bridge: Institute Giprostroymost, the firm which designed the bridge; Mostotrest, which has a contract to maintain the bridge; Zaliv Shipyard, which built a railroad line to the bridge; Stroygazmontazh Corporation, the main construction company that built the bridge; a subsidiary of Stroygazmontazh called Stroygazmontazh-Most and VAD, which built the roadway over the bridge, as well as access roads.

In March 2018, 29 Western countries and NATO expelled in total at least 149 Russian diplomats, including 60 by the United States, in response to the poisoning of Skripal and his daughter on 4 March in the United Kingdom, which has been blamed on Russia. Other measures were also taken.

Transiting ships to/from the Black Sea 
Turkish Foreign Minister Mevlüt Çavuşoğlu announced on 27 February that his government would legally recognise the Russian invasion as a "war", which provides grounds for implementing the Montreux Convention Regarding the Regime of the Straits blocking the transit of Russian Federation and Ukrainian military vessels into/from the Black Sea.

Independent company actions 
Following sanctions and negative sentiment towards engaging in Russian business, many companies have chosen to exit Russians or Belarusian markets voluntarily or in order to avoid potential future sanctions. Visa, Mastercard and American Express independently blocked Russian banks as of March 2. Jeffrey Sonnenfeld and colleagues at the Yale School of Management have produced, and are keeping updated, a detailed list tracking those companies which have exited the Russian market, which have reduced their operations there, or which have chosen to remain. Following Swiss sanctions on Russia, Credit Suisse issued orders to destroy documents linking Russian oligarchs to yacht loans, a move for which they faced considerable criticism.

A study from the University of St. Gallen and IMB found that of 1400 EU and G7 countries, less than 9% divested at least one subsidiary from the Russian market as of November 2022; 18% that exited were based in the United States, 15% in Japan and about 8% in the EU.

Consequences and assessment

Political significance 
The economic sanctions imposed on Russia, serve as a tool of nonrecognition policy, by underscoring that the countries which impose these sanctions do not recognize Russian annexation of Crimea. Having these sanctions in place prevents the situation from being treated as a fait accompli. As a reaction to the 2022 Russian invasion of Ukraine, Western nations introduced unprecedented sanctions on Russian individuals, energy commodities and high-tech industries with the aim to change Russia's "political behavior". According to a study by the Swedish Defence Research Agency, economic sanctions have so far failed forcing Russia to change its policy towards Ukraine.

Faisal Islam of BBC News stated that the measures were far from normal sanctions and were "better seen as a form of economic war". The intent of the sanctions was to push Russia into a deep recession with the likelihood of bank runs and hyperinflation. Islam noted that targeting a G20 central bank in this way had never been done before.

Effect on Russia 

The economic sanctions are generally believed to have helped weaken the Russian economy slightly and to intensify the challenges that Russia was facing.

A 2015 data analysis suggested Russia's entry into a recession, with negative GDP growth of −2.2% for the first quarter of 2015, as compared to the first quarter of 2014. Further, the combined effect of the sanctions and the rapid decline in oil prices in 2014 has caused significant downward pressure on the value of the ruble and flight of capital out of Russia. At the same time, the sanctions on access to financing have forced Russia to use part of its foreign exchange reserves to prop up the economy. These events forced the Central Bank of Russia to stop supporting the value of the ruble and increase interest rates.

Some believe that Russia's ban on western imports had the additional effect on these challenging events as the embargo led to higher food prices and further inflation in addition to the effects of decreased value of the ruble which had already raised the price of imported goods.

In 2016 agriculture has surpassed the arms industry as Russia's second largest export sector after oil and gas.

Federal budget and domestic economy 
In April 2022, Russia supplied 45% of EU's gas imports, earning $900 million a day. In the first two months after the invasion of Ukraine, Russia earned $66.5 billion from fossil fuel exports, and the EU accounted for 71% of that trade.

As of May 2022, the Russian Ruble showed an upward trend; inflation was also below expectations. Also in May 2022, the Russian Central Bank last slashed its key rate by 300 basis points to 11% in order to stimulate local investments. The federal trade surplus was increased due to high prices for Russian commodity exports and a rapid fall in imports. On 27 May 2022, Russian Finance Minister Anton Siluanov stated that extra revenues from the sale of natural gas in the amount of 13.7 billion € will be used to increase pension funds for retired individuals and families with children, as well for "special operations" in Ukraine. Russia has also increased energy exports to China and India to make up for decreased revenues in Europe. Bloomberg reported that in the first half of 2022, Russia pocketed an extra 24 billion $ from selling energy to both nations.

According to the IMF in its April 11, 2022 country report on Russia, the Russian economy is projected to see a -8.5% decrease in its real GDP in 2022, with an inflation of 21.3% in that same year. Despite projected contractions in some economic sectors, Russia has so far managed to avoid defaulting on its foreign currency debt. Russian inflation came in at a two-decade high of 17.8% year-on-year in April, up from 16.7% in March, but inflation on basic commodities such as food and fuel were modest. Consumer price growth slowed sharply from 7.6% in March to 1.6% in April, in line with some of the Western countries.

Citizens of the Russian Federation face surging inflation and unemployment, expensive credit, capital controls, restricted travel, and shortages of goods. Analysts have identified similarities with conditions in the decade following the collapse of the Soviet Union in 1991. Russia's Kaliningrad exclave faces ever-increasing isolation. A source close to the Kremlin told the Russian-language independent news website Meduza that "There's probably almost nobody who's happy with Putin. Businesspeople and many cabinet members are unhappy that the president started this war without thinking through the scale of the sanctions. Normal life under these sanctions is impossible."

On 27 June 2022, Bloomberg reported that Russia is poised to default on its foreign debt (eurobonds), for the first time since 1918 after the Bolshevik revolution. According to the source, the country missed a debt payment due to sanctions on Russian banks. Finance Minister Siluanov dismissed the possible default status as a "farce", since the RF has plenty of funds to repay the debt. Associated Press reported that the official default on Russian's foreign debt would take time to be confirmed. Financial analysts described Russia's situation as unique, since it has extensive amounts of cash to fulfill its debt obligations.

In late July 2022, the IMF upgraded Russia's GDP estimate by 2.5%, but some economists see a long-term problem for the Russian economy, and explain its resilience only by a short-term increase of energy prices. A Yale study projects a catastrophic outlook for Russian businesses if Western countries are able to keep up the sanctions against Russia's petrochemical industry. So far, Russia was able to leverage its economic power by cutting gas supplies to Europe, and play up its agricultural might as the largest wheat exporter globally. Western economists see long-lasting costs to the Russian economy from the exit of large foreign firms and brain drain, while Russia claims, it has replaced those entities with domestic investments. Long term, Russia's economy will depend on the price development of fossil fuel energy, and Russia's continued economic alliances with countries that do not impose sanctions, including China, the Middle East, India, as well as nations in Africa and South America.

Russia's gross domestic product contracted 4% in the second quarter of 2022, revised from 6.5%, with a 15.3% drop in wholesale trade, and a 9.8% contraction in retail trade. Despite the ongoing sanctions, 47 of the world's biggest 200 companies still have not left Russia, particularly energy companies remain invested there. U.K. energy giant Shell and Japanese trading firms Mitsui and Mitsubishi hold double-digit stakes in the Sakhalin-2 oil and natural gas project. On July 1, 2022, Putin signed a decree to allow the government to seize the Sakhalin-2 oil and natural gas project but further attempts to formally nationalize the assets of international firms were paused when the bill did not make it through the State Duma before the 2022 summer recess.  According to Western analysts, remaining companies have experienced expropriation and nationalization pressures, but officially Russia has denied that it is interested in such actions. In August 2022, Russia's trade and industry minister Denis Manturov stated, "we are not interested in the nationalization of enterprises or their removal.”

Russia pumps almost as much oil as before its 2022 invasion of Ukraine. Sales to the Middle East and Asia have made up for declining exports of gas and oil to Europe, and due to the higher price, Moscow made $20 billion monthly compared to $14.6 billion a year before (2021). Despite international sanctions, Russian energy sales have increased in value, and its exports have expanded with new financing options and payment methods for international buyers. According to the Institute of International Finance, "Russia is swimming in cash", earning $97 billion from oil and gas sales through July 2022. According to a former Russian energy executive, "there came a realization that the world needs oil, and nobody's brave enough to embargo 7.5 million barrels a day of Russian oil and oil products".

Russian local replacement companies and products
In 2022, several local companies and businesses emerged or were proposed in Russia to replace departed foreign businesses, their products,  websites banned by the Russian government, and events where Russia is prohibited from entry.

 Uncle Vanya (Дядя Ваня) was established to replace McDonald's. The McDonald's restaurants, which closed down as the company left Russia, were bought and reopened under the brand Vkusno & tochka.
 Rossgram (Россграм) was established to replace Instagram, and has close ties with the Russian government. This website also has crowdfunding and allowing users access to paid content.
 Rusovideniye (Русовидение) was established as a replacement for Eurovision, which also planned to include celebrities from India, China, Serbia, Kazakhstan, and the Donetsk and Lugansk separatist regions.
CoolCola, Fancy, Street by Ochakovo replace Coca-Cola, Fanta and Sprite soft drinks. Another drinks are Grink Cola by Slavda and Komi Cola by Syktyvkarpivo.

Effect on US and EU countries 
As of 2015, the losses of EU have been estimated as at least €100 billion. The German business sector, with around 30,000 workplaces depending on trade with the Russian Federation, also reported being affected significantly by the sanctions. The sanctions affected numerous European market sectors, including energy, agriculture, and aviation among others. In March 2016, the Finnish farmers' union MTK stated that the Russian sanctions and falling prices have put farmers under tremendous pressure. Finland's Natural Resources Institute LUKE has estimated that in 2015, farmers saw their incomes shrink by at least 40 percent compared to the previous year.

In February 2015, Exxon Mobil reported losing about $1 billion due to Russian sanctions.

In 2017, the UN Special Rapporteur Idriss Jazairy published a report on the impact of sanctions, stating that the EU countries were losing about "3.2 billion dollars a month" due to them. He also noted that the sanctions were "intended to serve as a deterrent to Russia but run the risk of being only a deterrent to the international business community, while adversely affecting only those vulnerable groups which have nothing to do with the crisis" (especially people in Crimea, who "should not be made to pay collectively for what is a complex political crisis over which they have no control").

In the wake of the 2022 Russian invasion of Ukraine, the US government considered new negotiations with Venezuela for crude oil, after new sanctions prohibiting and effectively ending all oil imports coming from Russia indefinitely.

In May 2022, the EU decided to partially ban Russian oil imports, except those obtained through pipelines via Hungary, Slovakia and the Czech Republic until the end of 2022. Crude oil prices again jumped as supplies for fossil fuels remained constrained; the decision by the European Council exacerbated worries about an already-tight energy market. Besides Hungary, which gained significant exemptions from the oil embargo, Italy was also initially an opponent of such sanctions. The Italian republic has been the only country in the EU that increased Russian oil imports since sanctions were announced. The EU oil embargo is now putting at risk one of Italy's largest refineries, located in Sicily's Province of Syracuse, that also produces other petroleum products and electricity from Russian crude.

Effect on global food supply 

Western countries have accused Russia to interfere with wheat exports from Ukraine due to armed confrontations in Odessa and other Ukrainian ports. Later the Kremlin pushed back and accused the West of imposing sanctions on the Russian economy that hinder the export of wheat from the Russian Federation. Spokesperson Dmitry Peskov referred to Russia as "a rather reliable grain exporter". During a meeting with Italian Prime Minister Mario Draghi, Putin confirmed Russia's willingness to make "a significant contribution to overcoming the food crisis through the export of grain and fertilizer" but mentioned Western sanctions as the caveat.

The head of the African Union, Senegalese President Macky Sall, remarked that the side effects of the EU's decision to expel many Russian banks from SWIFT will hurt the ability of African countries to pay for imported food and fertilizers from Russia. French President Emmanuel Macron responded that difficulties have nothing to do with EU sanctions.

On 30 June, Russia withdrew its troops from Snake Island in an avowed goodwill gesture to not obstruct U.N. attempts to open a humanitarian corridor, allowing grains to be shipped from Ukraine. Later on 16 July, major news outlets reported that Kyiv is definitely a step closer to being able to export grain through its Black Sea ports after talks with Russia, facilitated by Turkey, and the United Nations. On 22 July 2022, the facilitated exports of Ukrainian grain via the Black Sea amid the ongoing war has been described as “a beacon of hope” by the UN Secretary-General António Guterres during the signing ceremony in Istanbul, Turkey.

On 14 September 2022, UN Secretary-General Antonio Guterres reiterated his concerns over a constrained fertilizer supply from Russia due to the 2022 Russian invasion of Ukraine and subsequent economic sanctions. According to the source, UN diplomats held discussions to re-open the Togliatti-Odessa pipeline carrying ammonia. President Volodymyr Zelenskiy had offered such a move in exchange for the release of prisoners of war held by Russia. But TASS news agency quoted Kremlin spokesman Dmitry Peskov, who dismissed such an idea, as saying  “are people and ammonia the same thing?”.

At the 38th meeting of the Standing Committee for Economic and Commercial Cooperation (COMCEC) of the Organization of Islamic Cooperation (OIC) in Istanbul, Erdogan remarked that over 11 million tonnes of grain had been transported through the Black Sea Grain Corridor since the successful implementation of the Black Sea Grain Initiative. He also noted that the opening of the grain corridor through the Black Sea showed that a diplomatic solution is possible in the conflict between Russia and Ukraine.

Shifting of safe havens 
Under the sanctions imposed by the US and the European Union, Russian oligarchs began looking for safe havens financially. Many of them moved their wealth to countries like the United Arab Emirates (UAE), which could not match the Western sanctions. Investigations spotted a number of superyachts moored in Dubai and the Maldives. Private jets owned by these oligarchs were also tracked flying back and forth from Moscow to Dubai and Israel. The Russian elites have been shifting funds worth hundreds of millions of dollars from sanctioning countries like the UK and Switzerland to countries that do not impose sanctions like the UAE. Russian oligarchs facing sanctions from the West were not just seeking to buy properties in the UAE, but for long-term residence. Analysts assessed that these billionaires could avail the service of the Emirates’ "golden visa" program by investing at least $2.7 million in a local company or investment fund. The golden visa program could allow these oligarchs to live, work, and study in the UAE with full ownership of their business.

Space 
Continued international collaboration on the operation of and missions to the International Space Station (ISS) has been thrown into doubt.

Environmental effects 

Scientists suggest the sanctions could be used to accelerate the renewable energy transition/decarbonization (i.e. for Russian fossil fuels sanctions and due to e.g. increased public acceptance of increased energy prices, unconventional energy transition efforts and uncomfortable energy conservation measures). Europe's dependence on Russian fossil fuels lead to a push for energy independence via renewables. However, depending on various factors or decisions, the war could also have a detrimental effect on climate change mitigation. Secretary-general of the United Nations António Guterres stated that "instead of hitting the brakes on the decarbonization of the global economy, now is the time to put the pedal to the metal towards a renewable energy future." With political policy-makers deciding to replace Russian fossil fuel imports with other fossil fuels imports and European coal energy production and to subsidize fossil fuel companies for reduced prices, as well as due to Russia being "a key supplier" of materials used for "clean energy technologies", the reactions to the war may also have an overall negative impact on the climate emissions pathway. Furthermore, prices of essential metals, used i.a. in cars, has risen substantially via market mechanisms in anticipation of sanctions which may also have impacts on the environment.

Economic sanctions during the Russo-Ukrainian war have accelerated the use of coal in energy production worldwide. Coal use in Europe already increased by 14% in 2021, and is expected to rise another 7% in 2022.  Soaring natural gas prices have made coal more competitive in many markets, and some nations have resorted to coal as a substitute for potential energy rationing in winter 2022/23. With demand for coal increasing in Asia and elsewhere,  global coal consumption is forecast to rise again by 0.7% in 2022 to 8 billion tonnes. Burning coal or petroleum products emits significantly higher amounts of carbon dioxide and air pollutants compared to natural gas. The return to coal slows the transition to greener and more sustainable energy sources. Both the United States and Russia are top exporters of natural gas and coal.

Enforcement efforts 
The legal framework of sanctions varies across jurisdictions, including the means of enforcement and compliance.

Multilateral cooperation 
On February 26, 2022, the leaders of the European Commission, France, Germany, Italy, the United Kingdom, Canada, and the United States released "Joint Statement on Further Restrictive Economic Measures," committing to the launch of "a transatlantic task force that will ensure the effective implementation of our financial sanctions by identifying and freezing the assets of sanctioned individuals and companies that exist within our jurisdictions."

On March 16, 2022, financial intelligence units of Australia, Canada, France, Germany, Italy, Japan, the Netherlands, New Zealand, the United Kingdom, and the United States signed a joint letter of intent forming a working group to "enhance, expedite and engage" in coordinated efforts related to sanctions and asset recovery.

The same day, Janet Yellen and Merrick Garland announced the formation of the Russian Elites, Proxies, and Oligarchs (REPO) Task Force with the participation of relevant ministries from Australia, Canada, the European Commission, Germany, Italy, France, Japan, the UK. The Task Force members agree to collect and sharing information to take concrete action including sanctions, asset freezing, and civil and criminal asset seizure, and criminal prosecution.

FinCEN advisories for international banking and finance
Though it is a United States regulatory entity, the Financial Crimes Enforcement Network is a de facto international regulator due to the dominance of the American dollar and resultant use of U.S.-based correspondent accounts. In March 2022, FinCEN released two "Alerts" intended to instruct institutions on sanctions compliance. Each included several possible "flags" for a suspicious activity report under the Bank Secrecy Act for sanctions avoidance.

FIN-2022-Alert001 "FinCEN Advises Increased Vigilance for Potential Russian Sanctions Evasion Attempts"
 Sanctions Evasion Attempts Using the U.S. Financial System
 Sanctions Evasion Using Convertible Virtual Currency (CVC)
 Possible Ransomware Attacks and Other Cybercrime

FIN-2022-Alert002 "FinCEN Alert on Real Estate, Luxury Goods, and Other High Value Assets Involving Russian Elites, Oligarchs, and their Family Members"
 Real Estate
 Artworks
 Precious Metals, Stones, and Jewelry (PMSJs) 
 Other High-Value Assets

Enforcement activities of the United States
The primary United States sanctions law, International Emergency Economic Powers Act (IEEPA), permits the President (via the Treasury) to block (or "freeze") a designated foreign person or entity's assets. The law also prohibits any United States person from transacting business with the designated foreign person or entity. Specifically,  criminalizes activities that "violate, attempt to violate, conspire to violate, or cause a violation of any license, order, regulation, or prohibition," and allows for fines up to $1,000,000, imprisonment up to 20 years, or both. Additionally, United States asset forfeiture laws allow for the seizure of assets considered to be the proceeds of criminal activity.

On 3 February 2022, John "Jack" Hanick was arrested in London for violating sanctions against Konstantin Malofeev, owner of Tsargrad TV. Malofeev is targeted for sanctions by the European Union and United States for material and financial support to Donbass separatists. Hanick was the first person criminally indicted for violating United States sanctions during the War in Ukraine.

According to court records, Hanick has been under sealed indictment in the United States District Court for the Southern District of New York since November 2021. The indictment was unsealed March 3, 2022. Hanick awaits extradition from the United Kingdom to the United States.

In the March 1, 2022 State of the Union Address, American President Joe Biden announced an effort to target the wealth of Russian oligarchs.
On March 2, 2022, U.S. Attorney General Merrick B. Garland announced the formation of Task Force KleptoCapture, an inter-agency effort.

On March 11, 2022, United States President Joe Biden signed , "Prohibiting Certain Imports, Exports, and New Investment With Respect to Continued Russian Federation Aggression," an order of economic sanctions under the United States International Emergency Economic Powers Act against several oligarchs. The order targeted two properties of Viktor Vekselberg worth an estimated $180 million: an Airbus A319-115 jet and the motoryacht Tango. Estimates of the value of the Tango range from $90 million (U.S. Department of Justice estimate) to $120 million (from the website Superyachtfan.com).

On April 4, 2022, the yacht was seized by Civil Guard of Spain and U.S. federal agents in Mallorca. A United States Department of Justice press release states that the seizure of the Tango was by request of Task Force KleptoCapture, an interagency task force operated through the U.S. Deputy Attorney General. The matter is pending in the United States District Court for the District of Columbia.

The Department of Justice states that Malofeyev is the first sanctioned oligarch that the United States have charged.

Many of the legal proceedings against "Russian oligarchs" in the US and Europe have been described as a "witch hunt" or "surgically precise interventions" against Russians, who may or may not align themselves with Vladimir Putin. Russian oligarchs or their family members have at least 18 pending cases in European and American courts upon seizure of their properties after the 2022 Russian invasion of Ukraine. According to Bloomberg News, "the West is chasing Russian money", and at the same time, Russian businessmen are attempting to break the stereotype of illicit dealings by Russians in the Western world.

Russian counter-sanctions

2014 
Three days after the first sanctions against Russia, on 20 March 2014, the Russian Foreign Ministry published a list of reciprocal sanctions against certain American citizens, which consisted of ten names, including Speaker of the House of Representatives John Boehner, Senator John McCain, and two advisers to Barack Obama. The ministry said in the statement, "Treating our country in such way, as Washington could have already ascertained, is inappropriate and counterproductive", and reiterated that sanctions against Russia would have a boomerang effect. On 24 March, Russia banned thirteen Canadian officials, including members of the Parliament of Canada, from entering the country.

On 6 August 2014, Putin signed a decree "On the use of specific economic measures", which mandated an effective embargo for a one-year period on imports of most of the agricultural products whose country of origin had either "adopted the decision on introduction of economic sanctions in respect of Russian legal and (or) physical entities, or joined same". The next day, the Russian government ordinance was adopted and published with immediate effect, which specified the banned items as well as the countries of provenance: the United States, the European Union, Norway, Canada and Australia, including a ban on fruit, vegetables, meat, fish, milk and dairy imports. Prior to the embargo, food exports from the EU to Russia were worth around €11.8 billion, or 10% of the total EU exports to Russia. Food exports from the United States to Russia were worth around €972 million. Food exports from Canada were worth around €385 million. Food exports from Australia, mainly meat and live cattle, were worth around €170 million per year.

On August 7, 2014, Russia had previously taken a position that it would not engage in "tit-for-tat" sanctions, but, announcing the embargo, Russian prime minister Dmitry Medvedev said,"There is nothing good in sanctions and it was not an easy decision to take, but we had to do it." He indicated that sanctions relating to the transport manufacturing sector were also being considered. United States Treasury spokesperson David Cohen said that sanctions affecting access to food were "not something that the US and its allies would ever do".On the same day, Russia announced a ban on the use of its airspace by Ukrainian aircraft.

2015 
In January 2015, it became clear that Russian authorities would not allow a Member of the European Parliament, Lithuanian MEP Gabrielius Landsbergis, to make a visit to Moscow due to political reasons.

In March 2015, Latvian MEP Sandra Kalniete and Speaker of the Polish Senate Bogdan Borusewicz were both denied entry into Russia under the existing sanctions regime, and were thus unable to attend the funeral of murdered opposition politician Boris Nemtsov.

On June 5, 2015, Russian government has "termporarily" banned Latvian and Estonian canned fish products citing "health" concerns. Half of the countries' exports share accounted for Russia.

After a member of the German Bundestag was denied entry into Russia in May 2015, Russia released a blacklist to EU authorities of 89 politicians and officials from the EU who are not allowed entry into Russia under the present sanctions regime. Russia asked for the blacklist to not be made public. The list is said to include eight Swedes, as well as two MPs and two MEPs from the Netherlands. Finland's national broadcaster Yle published a leaked German version of the list.

In response to this publication, British politician Malcolm Rifkind (whose name was included on the Russian list) commented: "It shows we are making an impact because they wouldn't have reacted unless they felt very sore at what had happened. Once sanctions were extended, they've had a major impact on the Russian economy. This has happened at a time when the oil price has collapsed and therefore a main source of revenue for Mr Putin has disappeared. That's pretty important when it comes to his attempts to build up his military might and to force his neighbours to do what they're told." He added, "If there had to be such a ban, I am rather proud to be on it – I'd be rather miffed if I wasn't." Another person on the list, Swedish MEP Gunnar Hökmark, remarked that he was proud to be on the list and said "a regime that does this does it because it is afraid, and at heart it is weak".

On May 15, 2015, with regard to Russia's entry ban on European politicians, a spokesperson from the European Commission said,"The list with 89 names has now been shared by the Russian authorities. We don't have any other information on legal basis, criteria and process of this decision. We consider this measure as totally arbitrary and unjustified, especially in the absence of any further clarification and transparency."

2016 
On 29 June 2016, Russian president Vladimir Putin signed a decree that extended the embargo on the countries already sanctioned until 31 December 2017.

According to a 2020 study, the Russian counter-sanctions did not just serve Russia's foreign policy goals, but also facilitated Russia's protectionist policy. As a result of counter-sanctions, combined with government support of domestic agricultural production, production of grain, chicken, pork, cheese and other agricultural products has increased. Russia's food imports fell from 35% in 2013 to only 20% in 2018. The prices on these products have also risen dramatically though. In Moscow, from September 2014 to September 2018, the average price of cheese increased by 23%, milk by 35.7%, vegetable oil by 65%.

2022 
On 3 May 2022, Russia's president Putin signed a decree instructing the Russia government to create within 10 days, a list of sanctioned entities to whom exports of products and raw materials will be forbidden. This decree was described as "the Kremlin's toughest economic response" since a 31 March decree changing the payment schemes of natural gas contracts and Gazprom's halting of natural gas deliveries to Bulgaria and Poland on 27 April.

List of sanctioned individuals 

Sanctioned individuals include notable and high-level central government personnel and businessmen on all sides. In addition, companies suggested for possible involvement in the controversial issues have also been sanctioned.

See also 
 Countering America's Adversaries Through Sanctions Act (US)
 Economy of Ukraine
 Specially Designated Nationals and Blocked Persons List (US)
 International Emergency Economic Powers Act (US)
 International sanctions during apartheid
 International sanctions during the Venezuelan crisis
 List of companies that applied sanctions during the Russo-Ukrainian War
 Magnitsky Act (US)
 Russian financial crisis (2014–2016)
 Trading with the Enemy Act of 1917 (US)
 Yachts impacted by international sanctions following the Russian invasion of Ukraine

Notes

References

Further reading 
 Bond, Ian, Christian Odendahl and J. Rankin. "Frozen: The politics and economics of sanctions against Russia." Sentre for European Reform (2015). online
 Gilligan, Emma. "Smart Sanctions against Russia: Human Rights, Magnitsky and the Ukrainian Crisis." Demokratizatsiya: The Journal of Post-Soviet Democratization 24.2 (2016): 257–277. online
 Wang, Wan. "Impact of western sanctions on Russia in the Ukraine crisis." Journal of Politics & Law 8 (2015): 1+ online .

External links 
 Tracking sanctions against Russia, Reuters
Ukrainian crisis: sanctions and reactions, Information Telegraph Agency of Russia (owned by the Government of Russia)
Ukraine and Russia Sanctions, United States Department of State
EU sanctions against Russia over Ukraine crisis, European Union
Overview of the European Council policy on sanctions, European Council (European Union)

 
2010s economic history
2020s economic history
2010s in international relations
2020s in international relations
Boycotts of Russia
Boycotts of Ukraine
Foreign relations of Russia
Foreign relations of Ukraine
International sanctions
Russo-Ukrainian War
Russo-Ukrainian War
Reactions to the 2022 Russian invasion of Ukraine